The Ethmiinae are a subfamily of small moths in the superfamily Gelechioidea sometimes included in the Elachistidae or the Oecophoridae, but mostly in the Depressariidae as a subfamily Ethmiinae.

Genera
Seven genera are presently placed here; numerous others are now considered junior synonyms (mostly of Ethmia):
 Agrioceros
 Betroka
 Erysiptila
 Ethmia
 Macrocirca
 Pseudethmia
 Pyramidobela (sometimes placed in the Oecophoridae (or Oecophorinae, if the Ethmiidae are included in Oecophoridae as subfamily).
 Sphecodora

References

 See also Gelechioidea Talk page for comparison of some approaches to gelechioid systematics and taxonomy.

Further reading
"Ethmiinae Busck, 1909" at Markku Savela's Lepidoptera and Some Other Life Forms. Retrieved May 16, 2017.

 
Moth subfamilies
Depressariidae